The Coppa Ugo Agostoni is a semi classic European bicycle race held in Lissone, Italy. The race is held in memory of Italian cyclist Ugo Agostoni, winner of prestigious classic Milan–San Remo, killed during World War II. It is also called Giro della Brianza. Since 2005, the race has been organised as a 1.1 event on the UCI Europe Tour.

It is the second race of Trittico Lombardo, which includes three races held around the region of Lombardy in three consecutive days. These races are Tre Valli Varesine, Coppa Ugo Agostoni and Coppa Bernocchi.

From 1946 to 1958 the race was reserved to amateurs.

Winners

Wins per country

References

External links
 

UCI Europe Tour races
Cycle races in Italy
Classic cycle races
Sport in Lombardy
Recurring sporting events established in 1946
1946 establishments in Italy
Lissone